MediaCommons is an in-development all-electronic scholarly publishing network in media studies, being created in partnership with the Institute for the Future of the Book and with the support of New York University and the National Endowment for the Humanities.

MediaCommons established its first presence on the web in November 2006 with a now-defunct development site named "making MediaCommons," and opened its current web site in March 2007.  The first project established on MediaCommons was In Media Res, an ongoing feature in which notable scholars in media studies present and comment upon brief, timely videoclips, aiming to promote dialogue between scholars and the broader public about the significance of media representations and forms.

MediaCommons claims among its goals a transformation in scholarly publishing, suggesting that the network "will not simply shift the locus of publishing from print to screen, but will actually transform what it means to 'publish,' allowing the author, the publisher, and the reader all to make the process of such discourse just as visible as its product."  The network promises to speed up the processes of publishing, but also to shift the focus of scholarly publishing back to communication amongst scholars.  For this reason, the editors describe MediaCommons as a "scholarly network" rather than an electronic journal or press.

MediaCommons is also an experiment in reimagining the processes of peer review in the humanities, opening up the process to public debate and discussion, and using both web-based metrics and commentary to create a process of "peer-to-peer review."  The backbone of this system is a social networking system currently being built by the NYU Digital Library Technology Services.

MediaCommons has thus far published two commentable papers, one on the future of scholarly publishing, and the other on CommentPress, the WordPress theme developed by the Institute for the Future of the Book that allows for paragraph-by-paragraph commenting on lengthy documents.

The co-coordinating editors of MediaCommons are Kathleen Fitzpatrick and Avi Santo, and the project draws on the support of an editorial board of scholars from across the digital humanities.

External links 
 MediaCommons
 Institute for the Future of the Book
 Article on MediaCommons on Inside Higher Education
 Article on MediaCommons on Ars Technica
 Article on MediaCommons on ZDNet
 Article on MediaCommons on AcademicCommons

References 

Academic publishing
Electronic publishing